Bình Giang is a rural district (huyện) of Hải Dương province in the Red River Delta region of Vietnam. As of 2003 the district had a population of 106,689. The district covers an area of 105 km². The district capital lies at Kẻ Sặt.

References

Districts of Hải Dương province